Shah Rukh Khan is an Indian actor, film producer, and television personality predominantly known for his work in Bollywood. He is the recipient of several awards, including Filmfare Awards, Screen Awards, Zee Cine Awards, and IIFA Awards. Besides acting awards, he has received a number of state honours, including the Padma Shri by the Government of India in 2005, the Ordre des Arts et des Lettres in 2007, and the Legion of Honour in 2014 (both by the Government of France).

Khan made his acting debut with a leading role in the romantic drama Deewana (1992), which won him the Filmfare Award for Best Male Debut. The next year he won his first Best Actor trophy for his portrayal of a murderer in Baazigar, and a Best Performance in a Negative Role nomination (both at Filmfare) for his performance as an obsessive lover in Darr. Khan's most significant release of the 1990s was Dilwale Dulhania Le Jayenge. He portrayed a non-resident Indian who falls in love with the character played by Kajol, for which he earned another Filmfare Award for Best Actor as well as his first Screen Award. Khan later won two consecutive Filmfare Awards in the Best Actor category for his performances in Dil To Pagal Hai (1997) and Kuch Kuch Hota Hai (1998), both films focusing on a love triangle.

In 2000, Khan won the Filmfare Critics Award for Best Actor for his performance in the starring role of a music teacher in Mohabbatein (2000), for which he was also nominated at the Screen and the IIFA Awards in the Best Actor category. For his performance as an alcoholic in Devdas, he received various Best Actor awards in India including Filmfare, IIFA, Screen, and Zee Cine Awards. Khan was nominated for a Filmfare Award for Best Actor for three of his 2004 releases: the masala film Main Hoon Na, the star-crossed romance Veer-Zaara, and the drama Swades, the latter for which he won the award. For his performance in Chak De! India (2007), in which he played the former captain of the India men's national field hockey team, he won Filmfare, IIFA, Screen, and Zee Cine awards in the Best Actor category.

Khan starred in My Name Is Khan (2010), a drama based on the 11 September attacks, as a Muslim man with Asperger syndrome. Acknowledged as being among his career's best work, the performance won him many awards, including Best Actor from Filmfare, IIFA, Producers Guild, and Screen awards. He later received the IIFA Award for Best Actor, the Screen Award for Best Actor (Popular Choice), and the Zee Cine Critics Award for Best Actor – Male for his portrayal in the action thriller Don 2 (2011), a sequel to the 2006 film Don for which he had also earned the nomination of Best Actor at the Asian Film Awards. He won three consecutive Screen Awards in the Best Actor (Popular Choice) category for portraying a traveler in Chennai Express (2013), a street fighter in Happy New Year (2014), and a car tuner in Dilwale (2015). For Khan's performance as a dwarf in the comedy-drama Zero (2018), he was nominated for a Filmfare Award for Best Actor.

Awards and nominations

State honours

Notes

References



External links 
 

Khan, Shah Rukh
Awards